Moze Hunt Jones (February 21, 1883 – May 21, 1914) was a Democratic member of the Mississippi House of Representatives, representing Franklin County, from 1908 to his death.

Biography 
Moze Hunt Jones was born on February 21, 1883, in Little Springs, Franklin County, Mississippi. He was the son of William Franklin Jones and Iveanore (Hunt) Jones. Jones attended the public schools of Little Springs. He graduated from Mississippi College with a B. S. degree in 1902. He earned his law degree from the University of Mississippi at Oxford in 1903, and practiced law thereinafter. Other than being a lawyer, he also was a planter and owned and took care of a plantation. He was elected to the Mississippi House of Representatives, representing Franklin County as a Democrat, in November 1907. He was re-elected in 1911. However, he died on May 21, 1914, before his term ended.

References 

1883 births
1914 deaths
Democratic Party members of the Mississippi House of Representatives
People from Franklin County, Mississippi
Mississippi College alumni
University of Mississippi alumni